Tommy Stokholm Hansen (born 2 February 1950) is a Danish former footballer who played as a midfielder for Vejle Boldklub and Belgian club K. Beerschot VAV. He made two appearances for the Denmark national team from 1973 to 1975.

References

External links
 
 

1950 births
Living people
Danish men's footballers
Association football midfielders
Denmark international footballers
Denmark youth international footballers
Denmark under-21 international footballers
Vejle Boldklub players
K. Beerschot V.A.C. players
Danish expatriate men's footballers
Danish expatriate sportspeople in Belgium
Expatriate footballers in Belgium
People from Vejle Municipality
Sportspeople from the Region of Southern Denmark